Mary Zilba is an American singer and television personality best known for her singing career in Canada and her reign as Miss Ohio (Miss America Pageant).  She was one of the main cast members of The Real Housewives of Vancouver.

Early life

Mary Zilba was born in Toledo, Ohio, and is of French and Lebanese ancestry, attended Central Catholic High School and is a graduate of the University of Toledo where she earned her degree in Journalism / Broadcasting.  Zilba has been in the public spotlight nearly her entire life – she and her sister, Juliana, both held Miss Ohio titles.

Career
After her Miss Ohio win in 1986, Zilba's remained in Ohio where she spent her early career working in broadcasting as a reporter and, later, becoming a television host and MC. Eventually, she moved to Fort Lauderdale, Florida, where she conceptualized, wrote, and produced a popular travel series called Eye on Travel (unrelated to the web TV series with the same name). She later moved to Los Angeles, where she signed a music development deal. During this time, she began working in film and TV. She subsequently moved to Vancouver, British Columbia, where she started her singing career.

In March 2012, it was announced that Zilba had signed on to appear in The Real Housewives of Vancouver. She appeared for 2 seasons before the shows cancellation was announced.

Musically, Mary Zilba has garnered some Top 40 hits on Canadian Radio and most recently in 2013 her song, "HERO", went to #1 on the iTunes Charts in the United Kingdom.  She has worked with some of the industry's elite songwriters and producers including pop writer, Diane Warren.

In 2014, Mary Zilba made history as she became the first ever soloist given permission by the Vatican to sing in the sacred Sistine Chapel since its erection in the 15th century.Sistine Chapel 1st Violinist-Vocalist EVER Allowed To play since 1473

In March 2016, Zilba, with the backing of Rosemary Siemens on piano, Eli Bennett, and Jesse Sukkau on vocals, recorded a single "#VancoUBER" and released it on YouTube as part of a growing desire to see Uber in Vancouver.

Personal life
Born and raised in Ohio, Zilba has six brothers and sisters, and is a mother to three sons; Cole, Chase, and Chad. Cole is a recent graduate of UCLA; Chase attends Santa Monica college and is a working musician. Chad is a model/actor attending school in Los Angeles. When not working or caring for her family Zilba works for charity. She is an advocate for PETA and is a national spokesperson for the disorder Tuberous Sclerosis and sits on the TSCANADA national board of directors.

Discography

Albums
1999: Out of the Blue
2003: Fly
2009: Flashback Fast Forward 
2013 A Timeless Christmas

Singles
1997: "Do Me Right"
1998: "Seduction"
1998: "See You Again"
2003: "Put Your Arms Around Me"
2003: "Give It Up"
2003: "Whatever"
2003: "All Out of Love"
2008: "Unconditional"
2009: "Little Miss Reckless"
2012: "Hero"
2014: "Are You Sorry Now"

References

External links
Official website

1963 births
Living people
Musicians from Toledo, Ohio
American people of French descent
American people of Lebanese descent
American expatriates in Canada
American women singers
The Real Housewives cast members
Miss America 1980s delegates